The Catholic-National Conservative Party in Moravia, was a Czech catholic political party in Moravia. Party was founded by Mořic Hruban, who before cooperated with the Old Czech Party. Party operated in close relationship as a counterpart of the Catholic-National Conservative Party in Bohemia. On political congress on 26 January 1919 in Brno, party merged into newly established Czechoslovak People's Party.

References

Political parties established in 1911
Political parties disestablished in 1919
Catholic political parties
Political parties in Austria-Hungary
Defunct Christian political parties
Defunct political parties in the Czech Republic
KDU-ČSL